This is a complete list of United States Coast Guard vice admirals. The grade of vice admiral (or three-star admiral) is the second-highest in the Coast Guard, ranking above rear admiral (two-star admiral) and below admiral (four-star admiral).

The grade of vice admiral was first granted to the commandant of the Coast Guard during World War II. From 1942 to 1972, the Coast Guard had at most one vice admiral, either the commandant or the assistant commandant. Additional vice admirals were appointed in 1972 to command operating forces in the Atlantic and Pacific, and by 2021 the Coast Guard had four vice admirals on active duty. More than a dozen rear admirals received tombstone promotions to vice admiral when they retired, for either completing 40 years of service or being specially commended for performance of duty in actual combat before the end of World War II. Tombstone promotions for years of service ended on November 1, 1949, and for combat citations on November 1, 1959.

Of the 80 vice admirals who were appointed to that rank while on active duty, 68 were commissioned via the U.S. Coast Guard Academy (USCGA) or its predecessor, the U.S. Revenue Cutter Service School of Instruction (USRCSSI); 1 via the U.S. Merchant Marine Academy (USMMA); and 11 via officer candidate school (OCS).

List of vice admirals

The following list of vice admirals is indexed by the numerical order in which each officer was appointed to that rank. Each entry lists the officer's name, date of rank, number of years on active duty as vice admiral (Yrs), active-duty positions held while serving as vice admiral, year commissioned and source of commission, and number of years in commission when promoted to vice admiral (YC), and other biographical notes.

Timeline

History

World War II

The first vice admiral in the Coast Guard was appointed in March 1942, following the United States entry into World War II, when Coast Guard commandant Russell R. Waesche and two Navy officers were nominated to be temporary vice admirals under a 1941 statute that authorized an unlimited number of appointments in all grades for temporary service during a national emergency. The statute technically created temporary grades only up to rear admiral, but the Senate confirmed all three officers as vice admirals anyway. Three years later, Waesche became the first four-star officer in the Coast Guard when the commandants of the Coast Guard and Marine Corps were both authorized that rank until six months after the end of the war.

Postwar
After World War II, Congress consolidated all of the various statutes governing the Coast Guard into a single positive law, Title 14 of the United States Code, which lowered the rank of future commandants to vice admiral. In 1960, Congress restored the commandant's rank to admiral and raised the assistant commandant to vice admiral. Congress gave three-star rank to the commanders of Coast Guard Atlantic Area and Coast Guard Pacific Area in 1972.

Initially most vice admirals retired after their first three-star assignment. Only three of the eight commandants appointed after 1960 ever served as vice admirals, the other five being promoted directly from rear admiral. As late as 1990, rear admiral J. William Kime was selected for commandant over all three vice admirals. Follow-on assignments were rare until 1988, when vice commandant James C. Irwin was transferred to command the Coast Guard Atlantic Area, breaking the tradition that vice commandants retired with their commandants. Irwin retired in 1989 and was recalled to active duty to serve as the three-star commander of Joint Task Force Four, the predecessor of Joint Interagency Task Force South. Reappointments as vice admiral became more common after a fourth three-star position was created for the chief of staff of the Coast Guard in 1993.

21st century
In 2010, to support the Coast Guard's modernization plan, Congress removed the requirement that vice admirals be assigned as area commanders or chief of staff of the Coast Guard, and simply authorized the President to designate four positions to carry three-star rank in addition to the vice commandant. The chief of staff of the Coast Guard became the deputy commandant for mission support, and the deputy commandant for operations received a third star.

The Coast Guard Authorization Act of 2015 elevated the vice commandant to admiral and authorized Coast Guard officers to serve as additional vice admirals in positions outside the Coast Guard without having to retire and be recalled to active duty in that rank like Irwin and Clyde E. Robbins, the first director of intelligence and security for the Department of Transportation. In 2016, Marshall B. Lytle III became the director of command, control, communications and computers (C4) and cyber and chief information officer on the Joint Staff, the first Coast Guard officer to compete successfully for a joint three-star position that traditionally rotated between the Army, Navy, Air Force, and Marine Corps.

Tombstone vice admirals

From 1923 to 1959, Coast Guard officers could retire with a tombstone promotion to the rank and sometimes the pay of the next higher grade, if they had 40 years of service or had been specially commended for the performance of duty in actual combat before the end of World War II. More than a dozen rear admirals received tombstone promotions to vice admiral, and one vice admiral, Merlin O'Neill, received a tombstone promotion to admiral. Tombstone promotions for years of service ended on November 1, 1949, and for combat citations on November 1, 1959.

Legislative history
The following list of Congressional legislation includes all acts of Congress pertaining to appointments to the grade of vice admiral in the United States Coast Guard.

Each entry lists an act of Congress, its citation in the United States Statutes at Large, and a summary of the act's relevance.

See also
Vice admiral (United States)
List of United States Navy vice admirals on active duty before 1960
List of United States Coast Guard tombstone vice admirals
List of United States Coast Guard four-star admirals

Notes

United States Coast Guard
Coast Guard vice admirals
 
Coast Guard admirals
United States Coast Guard